The Biographical Dictionary of Ecuador (Spanish: Diccionario Biográfico del Ecuador) is a biographical dictionary in 22 volumes written by Rodolfo Pérez Pimentel.

References

External links
 Biographical Dictionary of Ecuador website 

Biographical dictionaries